Amy Hunter (born 11 October 2005) is an Irish cricketer who plays for Dragons and Ireland. In October 2021, during the final match of Ireland's tour of Zimbabwe, Hunter became the youngest cricketer, male or female, to score a century in an ODI match, doing so on her 16th birthday. As a result, Hunter was named as the Irish Times/Sport Ireland Sportswoman for October 2021.

Career
In October 2020, Hunter was named in Ireland's squad to play Scotland at the La Manga Club during their tour of Spain. However, the matches were called off due to the COVID-19 pandemic. In May 2021, Hunter was again named in Ireland's squad to face Scotland, this time for a four-match Women's Twenty20 International (WT20I) series in Belfast. She made her WT20I debut on 24 May 2021, for Ireland against Scotland.

In August 2021, Hunter was added to Ireland's squad for the 2021 ICC Women's T20 World Cup Europe Qualifier tournament in Spain. She replaced Shauna Kavanagh, after Kavanagh returned a positive test for COVID-19.

In September 2021, Hunter was named in Ireland's Women's One Day International (WODI) squad for their series against Zimbabwe, the first WODI matches to be played by the Zimbabwe team. She made her WODI debut on 5 October 2021, for Ireland against Zimbabwe. In the fourth and final match against Zimbabwe, Hunter scored 121 not out, becoming the youngest cricketer to score a century in one-day cricket. Hunter's century was also the highest individual score for Ireland in a WODI match, beating the previous record of 120 runs made by Karen Young.

In November 2021, she was named in Ireland's team for the 2021 Women's Cricket World Cup Qualifier tournament in Zimbabwe.

References

External links

2005 births
Living people
Irish women cricketers
Ireland women One Day International cricketers
Ireland women Twenty20 International cricketers
Place of birth missing (living people)
Dragons (women's cricket) cricketers
Typhoons (women's cricket) cricketers